{{Infobox person
| name                      = Jorge Mejia
| image                     = 
| alt                       = 
| caption                   = 
| birth_name                = Jorge Andres Mejia
| birth_date                =  
| birth_place               = 
| death_date                = 
| death_place               = 
| death_cause               = 
| citizenship               = United States
| education                 = 
| alma_mater                = B.A. University of Miami
| occupation                = music industry executive
| years_active              = 
| employer                  = Sony Music Publishing
| known_for                 = 
| title                     = President & CEO
| spouse                    = Amanda Mejia
| partner                   = 
| children                  = 
| awards                    = Latin Songwriters Hall of Fames "Premio Editores Ralph S. Peer" in 2016.Billboards "40 Under 40" in 2012., Billboards "Latin Power Players" 2020, 2019, 2018, 2017, 2016, 2015, 2011, 2010
}}Jorge Andres Mejia''' (born October 27, 1972) is a Latin Grammy Award nominated Colombian-born American composer, pianist, singer-songwriter and music industry executive as President & CEO at SonyMusic Publishing for Latin America and U.S. Latin. Mejia studied at the New World School of the Arts, the New England Conservatory of Music, and the University of Miami.

Early life and education

Mejia was born October 27, 1972, in Bogota, Colombia, but grew up in Miami, Florida. Jorge studied piano performance first at the New World School of the Arts, then at the New England Conservatory of Music, eventually transferring to the University of Miami to earn his B.A. in piano performance.

Professional

In 1997, Mejia joined Sony as an intern and rose steadily in the ranks to become President & CEO in 2019. Mejia heads up Sony Music Publishing's Latin America and U.S. Latin divisions, which is the largest Latin publishing corporation in the world following Sony's merger with EMI Music Publishing in 2012. Under Mejia's leadership, Sony Music Publishing Latin America and U.S. Latin divisions has won the so-called "Triple Crown" 2020, 2017 and 2016 by winning the ASCAP, SESAC and BMI "Publisher of the Year" awards, sweeping the award at the three major performing rights organizations' Latin award events. Mejia is a member of the Latin Songwriters Hall of Fame Board of Directors and part of the Advisory Board at the University of Miami's Frost School of Music.

Music
Mejia is a classical pianist and composer as well as singer-songwriter and founder of the band, The Green Room. He is a Steinway Artist. Mejia's latest project, An Open Book: A Memoir in Music, consists of an eBook and orchestral recording, which was recorded with the University of Miami's Henry Mancini Institute Orchestra and released via Sony Music Latin May 4, 2018. Prelude in F Major for Piano and Orchestra from An Open Book: A Memoir in Music was nominated in the Best Classical Contemporary Composition category for the 19th annual Latin Grammy Awards. El Nuevo Herald called An Open Book: A Memoir in Music "an instant classic...a rigorous and eclectic work." Mejia's album of original solo classical piano pieces, Preludes, was released June 26, 2015. Billboard called Mejia's Preludes "virtuoso, captivating pieces".

Awards

Mejia was awarded the 2016 "Premio Editores Ralph S. Peer" from the Latin Songwriters Hall of Fame for music publishing.  He was named as Billboards "40 Under 40" in 2012. He was named as one of Billboard'''s "Latin Power Players" in 2020, 2019, 2018, 2017, 2016, 2015, 2011 and in 2010.

Personal life
Mejia married Amanda Parker on October 27, 2012.

References

Living people
1972 births
Colombian emigrants to the United States
People from Bogotá
Musicians from Miami
American music industry executives
Colombian songwriters
Male songwriters
Sony people